Helena Dow (October 27, 1917 – April 22, 1998) was an American fencer. She competed in the women's individual foil event at the 1948 Summer Olympics.

References

External links
 

1917 births
1998 deaths
American female foil fencers
Olympic fencers of the United States
Fencers at the 1948 Summer Olympics
Sportspeople from Paterson, New Jersey
20th-century American women